Gonionota rosacea is a moth in the family Depressariidae. It was described by William Trowbridge Merrifield Forbes in 1931. It is found in Haiti, Cuba and the Dominican Republic.

References

Moths described in 1931
Gonionota